Reckendorf station is a railway station in the municipality of Reckendorf, located in the Bamberg district in Bavaria, Germany.

References

Railway stations in Bavaria
Buildings and structures in Bamberg (district)